Kim Abbott is an American politician. She has served as a Democratic member of the Montana House of Representatives for District 83 since 2017. Following the 2020 Montana House of Representatives election, she was selected as the House Minority Leader for the term beginning 2021.

From 2013 to 2021, Abbott served as co-director of the Montana Human Rights Network. She is openly gay.

References

|-

1979 births
21st-century American politicians
Lesbian politicians
LGBT state legislators in Montana
Living people
Democratic Party members of the Montana House of Representatives
University of North Carolina at Wilmington alumni